Neobisium beroni is a species of pseudoscorpions in the Neobisiidae family. It has only been found in Bulgaria. Its type locality is cave Svinskata peshtera, Lakatnik, Iskur River gorge, Sofiya, Bulgaria.

References

Neobisiidae
Animals described in 1963
Arachnids of Europe